Ichthyococcus australis is a species of the genus Ichthyococcus. It is also known as Southern lightfish.

References

Ichthyococcus
Fish described in 1980